Skyathea is a genus of fungi in the family Helotiaceae. This is a monotypic genus, containing the single species Skyathea hederae.

References

External links
Skyathea at Index Fungorum

Helotiaceae
Monotypic Ascomycota genera